Melinda Doolittle - EP is an EP by American Idol season 6 third-place finisher Melinda Doolittle. Doolittle performed a song for the show each week of the season, and each song appeared on the show's website the day after the performance for sale as a studio version. The EP is a compilation of the five most downloaded of Doolittle's studio recordings, all of which are covers of other artists.

Track listing
 "As Long As He Needs Me"
 "Home"
 "I'm a Woman"
 "Have a Nice Day"
 "Trouble Is a Woman"

2007 EPs
Melinda Doolittle albums